Following is a (currently incomplete) list of past United Kingdom MPs in alphabetical order.



A
See List of United Kingdom MPs: A

B
See List of United Kingdom MPs: B

C
See List of United Kingdom MPs: C

D
See List of United Kingdom MPs: D

E
See List of United Kingdom MPs: E

F
See List of United Kingdom MPs: F

G
See List of United Kingdom MPs: G

H
See List of United Kingdom MPs: H

I
See List of United Kingdom MPs: I

J
See List of United Kingdom MPs: J

K
See List of United Kingdom MPs: K

L
See List of United Kingdom MPs: L

M
See List of United Kingdom MPs: M

N
See List of United Kingdom MPs: N

O
See List of United Kingdom MPs: O

P
See List of United Kingdom MPs: P

Q
See List of United Kingdom MPs: Q

R
See List of United Kingdom MPs: R

S
See List of United Kingdom MPs: S

T
See List of United Kingdom MPs: T

U
See List of United Kingdom MPs: U

V
See List of United Kingdom MPs: V

W
See List of United Kingdom MPs: W

X

Y
See List of United Kingdom MPs: Y

Z
See List of United Kingdom MPs: Z

Lists by general election
List of MPs elected in the 1945 United Kingdom general election
List of MPs elected in the 1950 United Kingdom general election
List of MPs elected in the 1951 United Kingdom general election
List of MPs elected in the 1955 United Kingdom general election
List of MPs elected in the 1959 United Kingdom general election
List of MPs elected in the 1964 United Kingdom general election
List of MPs elected in the 1966 United Kingdom general election
List of MPs elected in the 1970 United Kingdom general election
List of MPs elected in the February 1974 United Kingdom general election
List of MPs elected in the October 1974 United Kingdom general election
List of MPs elected in the 1979 United Kingdom general election
List of MPs elected in the 1983 United Kingdom general election
List of MPs elected in the 1987 United Kingdom general election
List of MPs elected in the 1992 United Kingdom general election
List of MPs elected in the 1997 United Kingdom general election
List of MPs elected in the 2001 United Kingdom general election
List of MPs elected in the 2005 United Kingdom general election
List of MPs elected in the 2010 United Kingdom general election
List of MPs elected in the 2015 United Kingdom general election
List of MPs elected in the 2017 United Kingdom general election
List of MPs elected in the 2019 United Kingdom general election

Other lists
:Category:British MPs
List of MPs for Northern Ireland
List of MPs for Scotland
List of MPs for Wales
List of British MPs not elected from a major party
List of current United Kingdom MPs
List of United Kingdom MPs who died in the 1990s
List of United Kingdom MPs who died in the 2000s
List of United Kingdom MPs who died in the 2010s
List of United Kingdom MPs who died in the 2020s

External links 

 MPs, Lords and offices - UK Parliament
 TheyWorkForYou.com

Political history of the United Kingdom